Joshua John Bidwell (born March 13, 1976) is a former American football punter who played twelve seasons in the National Football League (NFL).  He played college football for the University of Oregon.  He was drafted by the Green Bay Packers in the fourth round of the 1999 NFL Draft, and also played for the Tampa Bay Buccaneers and Washington Redskins.  He was selected to the Pro Bowl in 2005.

Professional career

Green Bay Packers
Bidwell was drafted by the Green Bay Packers in the fourth round of the 1999 NFL Draft. He was diagnosed with testicular cancer on September 1, 1999 and was placed on the reserve/non-football illness list on September 5. In 2000, Bidwell beat out Tom Hutton for the starting punting job. He went on to start in all 16 games for nine consecutive seasons, from 2000 to 2008, four of those seasons were with the Packers. He was re-signed to a one-year contract worth $605,000 on April 30, 2003.

Tampa Bay Buccaneers
Bidwell was signed to a three-year contract by the Tampa Bay Buccaneers on March 13, 2004. He was selected to the 2006 Pro Bowl following the 2005 season. On November 27, 2006, he signed a contract extension with the team. He was placed on injured reserve due to a hip injury on August 17, 2009. He was released on March 4, 2010.

Washington Redskins
On March 23, 2010, Bidwell signed with the Washington Redskins. He was released on July 28, 2011.

Career statistics

References

External links
Tampa Bay Buccaneers bio

1976 births
Living people
People from Douglas County, Oregon
Players of American football from Oregon
American football punters
Oregon Ducks football players
Green Bay Packers players
Tampa Bay Buccaneers players
Washington Redskins players
National Conference Pro Bowl players
Ed Block Courage Award recipients